Hoosen Coovadia (born 1940 Durban) is a South African doctor, and Victor Daitz Professor emeritus at University of KwaZulu-Natal. He was awarded the 2013 AAAS Award for Scientific Freedom and Responsibility. He has also received the 1999 Star of South Africa Award from President Nelson Mandela and the 2000 Nelson Mandela Award for Health and Human Rights.

Life
Hoosen Mahomed Coovadia was born in Durban, South Africa, in 1940.   His grandparents had emigrated from India to South Africa in the 1880s. Coovadia attended St. Anthony’s, a Catholic school, and later Sastri College, a high school.

Coovadia briefly attended Medical School at the University of Natal, which at that time was racially stratified, before moving to Bombay, India for medical training. He was accepted at the Grant Medical College at the University of Bombay. After graduating, he returned to Durban to work at the King Edward VIII Hospital. He worked in pediatrics at the University of Natal and the Colleges of Medicine of South Africa and then went to the University of Birmingham, earning his M.Sc. in Immunology in 1974. He then rejoined the Department of Pediatrics at the University of Natal, receiving an M.D. in 1978.

He was appointed Associate Professor at the University of Natal in 1982 and Ad Hominem Professor in 1986. From 1990 to 2000, he served as Professor and Head of Paediatrics and Child Health at the University of Natal. He has since served as the Victor Daitz Chair in HIV/AIDS Research, Director of Biomedical Science at the Centre for HIV/AIDS Networking (HIVAN), and the scientific director of the Doris Duke Medical Research Institute at the Nelson Mandela School of Medicine at the University of KwaZulu Natal.

Coovadia was involved in the leadership of the United Democratic Front (UDF) in the 1970s. He became chairman of the Commission on Maternal and Child Health, created by the Mandela government. He served on the executive of the National Medical and Dental Association (NAMDA), formed in 1982. In the 1980s, Coovadia focused on issues of malnutrition and childhood diseases, but then expanded his focus to include AIDS, particularly mother-to-child transmission. He was a vocal critic of the AIDS policies of Thabo Mbeki's government and campaigned actively for the use of antiretroviral therapy. In 2000, he served as co-chair of the International AIDS Conference in Durban.

Works
Host Allergic Response Variation in Children with Measles Infection, University of Natal, Durban, 1977

References

External links

South African paediatricians
1940 births
Academic staff of the University of KwaZulu-Natal
University of Mumbai alumni
Alumni of the University of Birmingham
Academic staff of the University of Natal
Living people
University of Natal alumni
South African people of Indian descent
South African medical researchers
People from eThekwini Metropolitan Municipality
Segregation
Apartheid in South Africa
Anti-apartheid activists
Members of the National Academy of Medicine
Fellows of the African Academy of Sciences